New York City's 22nd City Council district is one of 51 districts in the New York City Council. It has been represented by Democrat Tiffany Cabán since December 2021.

Geography
District 22 is based in northern Astoria in Queens, also covering parts of East Elmhurst, and Woodside. Rikers Island, which is officially part of the Bronx, is located within the district.

The district overlaps with Queens Community Boards 1 and 3, and with New York's 12th and 14th congressional districts. It also overlaps with the 12th and 13th districts of the New York State Senate, and with the 30th, 34th, 35th, 36th, and 37th districts of the New York State Assembly.

Recent election results

2021
In 2019, voters in New York City approved Ballot Question 1, which implemented ranked-choice voting in all local elections. Under the new system, voters have the option to rank up to five candidates for every local office. Voters whose first-choice candidates fare poorly will have their votes redistributed to other candidates in their ranking until one candidate surpasses the 50 percent threshold. If one candidate surpasses 50 percent in first-choice votes, then ranked-choice tabulations will not occur.

2017

2013

References

New York City Council districts